Aciurina is a genus of tephritid  or fruit flies in the family Tephritidae.

Species
Aciurina aplopappi (Coquillett, 1894)
Aciurina bigeloviae (Cockerell, 1890)
Aciurina ferruginea (Doane, 1899)
Aciurina idahoensis Steyskal, 1984
Aciurina lutea (Coquillett, 1899)
Aciurina maculata (Cole, 1919)
Aciurina mexicana (Aczél, 1953)
Aciurina michaeli Goeden, 1996
Aciurina mixteca Hernández-Ortiz, 1994
Aciurina notata (Coquillett, 1899)
Aciurina opaca (Coquillett, 1899)
Aciurina semilucida (Bates, 1935)
Aciurina thoracica Curran, 1932
Aciurina trilitura Blanc & Foote, 1961
Aciurina trixa Curran, 1932

References

Tephritinae
Tephritidae genera
Taxa named by Charles Howard Curran
Diptera of North America